The Danish slave trade occurred separately in two different periods: the trade in European slaves during the Viking Age, from the 8th to 10th century; and the Danish role in selling African slaves during the Atlantic slave trade, which commenced in 1733 and ended in 1807 when the abolition of slaves was announced. The location of the latter slave trade primarily occurred in the Danish West Indies (Saint Thomas, Saint Croix, and Saint John) where slaves were tasked with many different manual labour activities, primarily working on sugar plantations. The slave trade had many impacts that varied in their nature (economic and humanitarian), with some more severe than others. After many years of slavery in the Danish West Indies, Christian VII decided to abolish slave trading.

Danish slave trade during the Viking Age 
During the Viking Age, thralls (Norse slaves) were an important part of the economy and one of the main reasons for the raids on England in which slaves were captured. This practice was largely abandoned once Denmark became Christian in the 10th century.

Danish transatlantic slave trade 

The involvement in the transatlantic slave trade began in the mid 1700’s when they would transport African peoples to what was known then as The Gold Coast (located in the city of Accra in Ghana). Fort Christiansborg was the Danish fort that controlled the incomings and outgoings of slaves; the base in Ghana for the Danes.

The Danes had control over the Danish West Indies for around 250 years, from 1672 up until its sale to the U.S in 1917. The Danish West Indies played a significant role in the Danish slave trade as this was the final destination for many of the slaves. The three islands that made up the Danish West Indies included Saint John, Saint Thomas, and Saint Croix.

Sugar, coffee, and tobacco were the primary resources that were cultivated on the islands as they all provided the Danes with significant returns. Plantation work was perceived as extremely demanding, especially for female slaves who were unable to maintain the high degree of manual labour that was required. The standard of living on the islands was very poor, with many slaves often catching fatal diseases or dying from exhaustion and malnutrition. A common misconception was that slaves were given enough food provisions weekly that would sustain them during their work, however, according to Martens (2016), these provisions were unsatisfactory and did not meet the minimum requirements to live healthily.

In 1915, negotiations between America and Denmark began over the sale of the three islands (Saint Thomas, Saint Croix, Saint John). The U.S became increasingly concerned Germany would make an attempt to acquire the islands and decided to act upon their instinct. Eventually, the U.S bought the islands for US$25,000,000 of gold coin. The islands are now known as the U.S Virgin Islands.

Saint Thomas 
Saint Thomas was the first island in the Danish West Indies that was used by the Danes for slave labour. It was the order of then King Christian V to seize the island with the sole aim of acquiring the plantations on the island, which included primarily sugar and tobacco produce. A problem the Danish West India Company soon encountered was that convicts were terrible workers, and it is for this reason that they came to the realisation that colonists from neighbouring countries who had access to African slaves were much better suited to the nature of the work.

Before sugar plantations became the most popular crop, the Danish government established Taphus. Taphus were essentially beer houses and halls that produced vast amounts of the alcohol to be transported overseas. However, the beer halls quickly became very unpopular with the Danish government as it attracted pirates to the islands, and also the economic benefit of producing beer was outweighed by the costs of building the infrastructure for the halls. In the early 1700’s, sugar quickly became the most popular crop, with plantations scattered all over the island. With strict Danish government officials overseeing workers in St Thomas, slave traders would visit St. Thomas to purchase slaves as they were known to be good workers.

Saint John 
One of the first locations where the Danes brought African slaves was Saint John. In 1717, 150 African slaves from Akwamu (now Ghana) were brought to the islands to work on the plantations. At the time, the island only cultivated cotton and tobacco. During the transition from Saint Thomas to Saint John, the Akwamu slaves all revolted against the owners of the plantations by taking over the property and deploying slaves from other African tribes to complete the work. Reasons for this revolt came from the introduction of harsh slave policies, new African slaves who would have rather died than be slaves, and a summer of natural disasters. However, by 1734, the plantation owners eventually regained control of the island. The primary reason for revolts such as these was due to the fact that owners did not reside on the island. Instead, they would rely upon overseers, who were known as “mesterknægte”.

Saint Croix 
In 1733, the Danish West Indies Company bought Saint Croix from the French government. A key attribute of Saint Croix was its independent government, which differentiated it to Saint Thomas and Saint John. Planters soon became frustrated with this and demanded the King of Denmark buy the company. As Saint Croix was the most lucrative island out of the three, the King decided that it should be the capital of the three islands. This meant the capital was to be moved from Saint Thomas to Saint Croix. 

Saint Croix’s wealth was heavily attributed to its production of sugar, but also rum. The other commodities it exported included cotton, molasses, and hard woods. By 1803, there was a total of 26,500 slaves on the island (the most out of the three), but as Denmark’s role in the slave trade began to fade, this number reduced significantly.

Impacts of the slave trade 
The Danish Slave trade had a range of impacts, ranging from humanitarian consequences to economic changes. Also, the severity of these impacts ranged massively as some were fatal and others purely menial consequences that arose as a result of a significant power imbalance.

Human impact 
For the duration of the slave trade, it is estimated that over 100,000 African slaves were transported to the Danish West Indies, with approximately half of them dying due to the inhumane conditions. From 1733 (after the concept of New World Slavery was introduced), owners of the sugar plantations would threaten any slave that was abusive or disrespectful towards white people. For those who did not obey these orders, they were scored with red-hot iron tongs or even hung if the slave owner did not see the need for the slave.

Economic impact 
A key motive for the Danish government to transport slaves to the West Indies was the potential economic gain. The production of sugar was a key objective for the Danes as it provided them with high returns from buyers and investors. Trading sugar with other nations for other commodities such as rice, rum and cotton meant that Denmark had a means of negotiation when purchasing commodities. On top of the significant returns produced by the sugar production, many Danish citizens were employed on the plantations, contributing to a low unemployment rate in Denmark at the time. Historians are still unsure as to the profitability companies actually made, yet it is estimated that the profit margins were around 2.58% annually.

Slave trade abolition 
In 1792, Christian VII of Denmark announced the Danes would be abolishing their slave trade practices in the Danish West Indies. The announcement declared from the start of 1803 the Danes would no longer partake in slave trading on the African coast.

Economic and humanitarian concerns are seen as the primary reasons why the Danish slave trade was abolished. Economically, politicians no longer saw the slave trade as a profitable means of improving the nation’s economy. On a humanitarian level, the conditions and treatment of workers were beginning to become heavily scrutinized by the world’s population. As such, Denmark wanted to become the first European nation to abolish the slave trade and ensure they did before the British, which would, in turn, provide them with international recognition.

Denmark's Apology 
For many years, historians and citizens of the world questioned why Denmark never apologised for the slave trade that took place for over 70 years. However, in 2017, foreign minister, Anders Samuelsen, apologised for the many years of torture and treatment of African slaves. In his apology to the Ghanaian president, Nana Akufo-Addo, Anders claimed “Nothing can justify the exploitation of men, women and children in which Denmark took part”.

Many years before the apology, Denmark (through its DANIDA Agency) had been helping Ghana with both social and economic sectors, human rights, and good governance. More recently, Ghana and Denmark formulated a partnership aimed at supporting COVID-19 responses across Africa. Since the Danish slave trade took part, Denmark has felt indebted to Ghana which is the primary reason why Denmark has been investing both economically and socially for many years.

See also
 Danish West Indies slavery
 Danish Africa Company
 Danish West India Company
 Danish Gold Coast
 Dane gun
 Fort Christiansborg

References

Further reading
 Andersen, Astrid Nonbo. ""We Have Reconquered the Islands": Figurations in Public Memories of Slavery and Colonialism in Denmark 1948–2012." International Journal of Politics, Culture, and Society 26, no. 1 (2013): 57-76. Accessed May 24, 2021. http://www.jstor.org/stable/42636435.
 Jensen, Niklas Thode; Simonsen, Gunvor. "Introduction: The historiography of slavery in the Danish-Norwegian West Indies, c. 1950-2016." Scandinavian Journal of History Sep-Dec2016, Vol. 41 Issue 4/5, p475-494.
 Source

 
African slave trade
Afro-Caribbean history
Economic history of Denmark
Economic history of Norway
Foreign trade of Denmark
History of Ghana
History of West Africa
History of the Danish West Indies
Maritime history of Denmark
Maritime history of Norway
Slavery in Norway
Slavery in the Caribbean